Bozyazı Island is a small Mediterranean island in Turkey.

Its distance to shore is only  and in 1982 a road was constructed between the main land and the island by embankment. But in 2009 the artificial connection was abandoned.

Although it is currently uninhabited there are ruins on the island. The island was once a part of the Nagidos ancient city. However, during the Cilician pirates age the city lost its former importance and the population mostly concentrated in the island then called "Nagidudos" or "Tagiduda".

According to the Ministry of Forestry the island is declared an archaeological site .

References

Islands of Turkey
Islands of Mersin Province
Bozyazı District
Mediterranean islands